Daniela Maccelli (8 December 1949 – 27 November 2022) was an Italian gymnast. She competed at the 1968 Summer Olympics. At the time she belonged to the Etruria of Prato.

References

External links

1949 births
2022 deaths
Italian female artistic gymnasts
Olympic gymnasts of Italy
Gymnasts at the 1968 Summer Olympics
Sportspeople from Florence